David Noon (1878 – 26 March 1938) was a British cyclist. He competed in the 100km event at the 1908 Summer Olympics.

References

External links
 

1878 births
1938 deaths
English male cyclists
Olympic cyclists of Great Britain
Cyclists at the 1908 Summer Olympics
Sportspeople from Birmingham, West Midlands